Ivan Bulat (born 24 June 1975) is a Croatian retired footballer who played as a midfielder, and the manager. He currently serves as a director of football of Croatian club HNK Šibenik.

Bulat was appointed as the director of football of his hometown club in summer of 2017, when his older brother Josip became the club's chairman of the Supervisory Board.

International career
Bulat made five appearances for the Croatia national under-21 team.

Honours

Player
NK Zagreb
 Croatian First League: 2001–02

References

External links
 Ivan Bulat at Croatian Football Federation

1975 births
Living people
Sportspeople from Šibenik
Association football midfielders
Croatian footballers
Croatia under-21 international footballers
HNK Šibenik players
NK Osijek players
Hapoel Petah Tikva F.C. players
Hapoel Tzafririm Holon F.C. players
Maccabi Ahi Nazareth F.C. players
NK Zagreb players
Beijing Renhe F.C. players
Chongqing Liangjiang Athletic F.C. players
Chengdu Tiancheng F.C. players
Croatian Football League players
Israeli Premier League players
Liga Leumit players
Chinese Super League players
China League One players
Croatian expatriate footballers
Expatriate footballers in Israel
Croatian expatriate sportspeople in Israel
Expatriate footballers in China
Croatian expatriate sportspeople in China
Croatian football managers
HNK Šibenik managers